China Medical University (CMU) is a private university in Taichung, Taiwan. The university enrolls approximately 8,000 students.

History

Brief Introduction
CMU was established as China Medical College on June 6, 1958 and was renamed to China Medical University in 2003. It is the first academic institution in Taiwan where Chinese professors offer medicine and pharmacy programs. The university has two major campuses, Taichung Beigang; 

CMU includes seven college degree programs these are: western medicine, Chinese medicine, pharmacy (including Chinese herbs), health care (including nursing), life sciences, public health, and management are provided.

Milestones
 1958 - The establishment of China Medical College.
 1980 - The establishment of China Medical College Taichung Hospital.
 1984 - The establishment of China Medical College Beikang campus.
 1985 - The establishment of China Medical College Beikang Hospital.
 1997 - China Medical College Taichung Hospital was promoted to a Would-be Academic Medical Centers.
 2000 - China Medical college Taichung Hospital was promoted to an Academic Medical Centers.
 2003 - China Medical College was renamed as China Medical University.
 2007 - Inauguration of Wuquan campus.
 2008 - China Medical University Beikang Hospital was promoted to a Metropolitan Teaching Hospital
 2010 - Ground breaking ceremony of the Build-Operate-Transfer (BOT) project for the planned Tainan Municipal Annan Hospital.
 2014 - Center of Excellence for Chinese Medicine was awarded the Top-notch Research Center by the Ministry of Education.

 2018 - Center of Excellence and New Drug Development Center was awarded the Top-notch Research Center by the Ministry of Education.

2018 - Chinese Medical University Hospital received Joint Commission International (JCI) Accreditation.

International Collaboration Network

Quick Facts

See also
 List of universities in Taiwan

References

External links 

 China Medical University, Taiwan Website

 
Educational institutions established in 1958
1958 establishments in Taiwan